Saccharolysin (proteinase yscD, yeast cysteine proteinase D, Saccharomyces cerevisiae proteinase yscD) is an enzyme. This enzyme catalyses the following chemical reaction

 Cleavage of Pro-Phe and Ala-Ala bonds

This cytoplasmic metalloendopeptidase is present in Saccharomyces cerevisiae.

References

External links 
 

EC 3.4.24